The Office of the Director of Public Prosecutions (ODPP) Fiji is an independent office by virtue of section 117 of the 2013 Constitution of Fiji. The ODPP is motivated by the principle that it is in the interest of justice that the guilty be brought to justice and the innocent are not wrongly convicted.

The Constitution of the Republic of Fiji authorises the Director of Public Prosecutions (DPP) to independently govern all matters concerning public prosecutions and ensures its independence not only for prosecution matters but also authorises the DPP alone, to determine all matters pertaining to the employment of all staff and administrative matters concerning the ODPP.

History

The ODPP was first established under the Fiji Independence Order 1970 and has had a continued existence under the Constitutions of 1990, 1997 and 2013. Mr Ghananand Mishra was Fiji's first Director of Public Prosecutions appointed in 1970. (See 3.1 for List of DPPs)

Functions 

The Director of Public Prosecutions is granted discretionary powers under the Constitution to conduct, take over, and discontinue criminal prosecutions in the courts of Fiji, except for proceedings undertaken by the Fiji Independent Commission Against Corruption. The 2013 Constitution under section 117 authorises the DPP to independently govern all matters concerning public prosecutions and ensures its independence not only for prosecution but also to determine all matters pertaining to the employment of all staff and prosecutors. The ODPP plays a key role in supporting the enforcement of criminal laws in Fiji, international laws, treaties and conventions that the Fijian Government has ratified, as well as contributing towards the continued development and maintenance of a just and fair criminal justice system.

The 2013 Constitution, for the first time ever, provides the DPP full control over a parliamentary-approved budget as well as control over administrative staff and the appointment of legal staff.

Director of Public Prosecutions Fiji 
The DPP is appointed by the President on the recommendation of the Judicial Services Commissions. Section 117 of the 2013 Constitution states that the DPP is appointed for a term of 7 years and is eligible for reappointment. He or she must also be a person who is qualified to be appointed as a Judge.

The Constitution also empowers the DPP to appoint any legal practitioner, whether from Fiji or from another country to be a public prosecutor for the purposes of any criminal proceeding.

Section 51(2) of the Criminal Procedure Act, 2009 also empowers the DPP to appoint police officers to be police prosecutors for the purpose of conducting prosecutions in the Magistrates’ Courts of Fiji.

The DPP also has the authority to appoint, remove and institute disciplinary action against all staff (including administrative staff) of the ODPP.

In summary, the Constitution authorises the DPP to independently govern all matters concerning public prosecutions and ensures its independence not only for prosecution matters but also authorises the Director, alone, to determine all matters pertaining to the employment of all staff and administrative matters concerning the ODPP.

The current DPP is Christopher Pryde who was appointed to the position in November 2011.

Prior to this, Christopher Pryde was Fiji's Solicitor General, a position he held since 2007 and, in addition to this, Mr Pryde was Fiji's Permanent Secretary for Justice and Anti-Corruption until his appointment as the country's DPP.

Mr Pryde's contract was renewed as the DPP for another seven years in 2019.

List of DPPs

Assistant DPPs 
The Assistant DPPs play an advisory role to the DPP and a managerial role in governing the (legal) operational functions of the ODPP, on behalf of and on the instructions of the DPP.

The ADPPs assist the DPP in the smooth and efficient functioning of the ODPP by ensuring that all criminal cases are prosecuted in accordance with the law and prosecution principles, in a timely manner. In assisting the DPP in the efficient management of the ODPP and in the enforcement of the criminal laws in Fiji, they are expected to keep themselves up-to-date with local and global developments in criminal law and procedures.

Accordingly, they actively contribute towards staff professional development by participating and conducting regular training for State Counsel and by establishing a mentoring role within the ODPP team. They also play a proactive role in raising public awareness of criminal legal issues, with special focus on changes in criminal law and procedures.

Currently, there are three Assistant DPP's in Fiji, Lee Burney, Dr Andrew Jack and Elizabeth Rice.

See also 
The ODPP Fiji launched its revamped website and Twitter handle in 2015.

References

External links
 ODPP official website

DPP
1970 establishments in Fiji